Frédéric Épaud (born 12 May 1970) is a French actor. He was born in Les Sables-d'Olonne.

Filmography
Kings and Queen (dir. Arnaud Desplechin, 2004).
Les Fragments d'Antonin (dir. Gabriel Le Bomin, 2006).
Tel père telle fille (dir. Olivier de Plas, 2007).
L'Auberge rouge (dir. Gérard Krawczyk, 2007).
Les Yeux bandés (dir. Thomas Lilti, 2007).
Coluche, l'histoire d'un mec (dir. Antoine de Caunes, 2008).
Go Fast (dir. Olivier Van Hoofstadt, 2008).
Fais-moi plaisir! (dir. Emmanuel Mouret. 2009).
The Last Flight (dir. Karim Dridi, 2009).
La Sainte Victoire, (dir. François Favrat, 2009).
Accomplices (dir. Frédéric Mermoud, 2009).
Le Paradis des bêtes (dir. Estelle Larrivaz, 2012).
Superstar (dir. Xavier Giannoli, 2012).Une Estonienne à Paris (dir. Ilmar Raag, 2012).Vive la France (dir. Michaël Youn. 2013).Jappeloup (dir. Christian Duguay, 2013).Taj Mahal (dir. Nicolas Saada, 2015).Un sac de billes'' (dir. Christian Duguay, 2017).

References

External links
 

Living people
21st-century French male actors
1970 births
French male film actors
French male television actors
People from Les Sables-d'Olonne